The AIB Division Three is a rugby union league in Ireland.

Past winners

2010 Teams
Ards
Banbridge
Barnhall
Connemara
Corinthians
County Carlow
Midleton
Naas
Nenagh Ormond
Old Wesley
Portadown
Queen's University
Rainey Old Boys
Sunday's Well
Suttonians
Navan

References

All-Ireland League (rugby union)